Kaori Takahashi may refer to:

, Japanese synchronized swimmer
, Japanese actress